"You Do" is a song by English musical duo McAlmont & Butler, released on 23 October 1995 as the second single from their debut album, The Sound Of... McAlmont & Butler (1995). The single charted at number 17 on the UK Singles Chart.

Track listings
UK CD1
 "You Do" (radio edit)
 "Although"
 "The Debitor"

UK CD2
 "You Do"
 "Tonight"
 "You'll Lose a Good Thing"

UK cassette single
 "You Do" (radio edit)
 "Although"

Charts

References

1995 singles
1995 songs
Hut Records singles
Songs written by Bernard Butler
Songs written by David McAlmont